Tony Rapacioli, also known as Praha and Kansai, is an electronic music producer and sound designer from London, England. Rapacioli used the music persona mainly when he was producing and remixing progressive house tracks.

Throughout his career, Rapacioli has used a number of different musical aliases for his work as a producer, songwriter, DJ and remixer. His work has featured on record labels including Platipus Records and AM PM Records, and has featured on various compilation albums for both Virgin/EMI and also Ministry of Sound. His track Rococo, featured on Midnight Club II.

Rapacioli also founded the sound design record label, Zenhiser, which is based in Noosa, Australia.

Musical career
Rapacioli started his music career as a DJ, with DJ sets on pirate radio station Touchdown FM.

Following his initial work as a DJ, Rapacioli began to write and produce singles. This began in 1992, when he worked as Sly T with Ollie J on their single "Underground Confusion" for Black Market International. After working on his first single as a writer, he recorded a second single under the same alias, titled "Help Me".

After a break in producing and writing, Rapacioli became involved again with Triptonic, producing the tracks "Brain Step" and "Do You Feel" in 1996. A year later, he wrote and produced the house track by GRN, "Off World". In 1999, the single "Pure Energy" was released by Dreamcatcher. All of the production for the single "Home" was carried out by Rapacioli.

In 1999, Rapacioli featured on his first Ministry of Sound compilation, the Clubbers Guide to...Australia with the remixed version of TR Junior's track "Rock with Me".

The alias Praha was first used in the year 2000, when Rapacioli released three separate tracks under the name. They were the first solo tracks he had released as an artist, and they included the track, "Pachinko". After he started using the Praha artist name, he remixed the La Rissa track, "I Do Both Jay & Jane". The track featured on the Ministry of Sound album, Clubbers Guide to... Ibiza. Later the same year, Rapacioli featured on the Ministry of Sound's The Annual. The track on the album was "Outlaw" by Fu Man Choo. The remixed track also featured on Trance Nation.

In 2002, the compilation album Future Chill by Virgin EMI Records featured the Dreamcatcher track, "I Don't Want to Lose My Way". Trance Nation: Deeper was released in 2003 and featured a remix by Rapacioli.

From 2001 onwards, a number of tracks written by Rapacioli featured on various compilation albums. This began with the track "Pachinko", which featured on Progressive Anthems by Virgin EMI Records. It also featured on Dave Pearce's True Euphoria in 2001. Later that year, he released the single, "Ce La Faro".

Rapacioli had his single "Shake Baby" remixed by Tall Paul in late 2002. The remixed version of the track featured on the compilation album, Future Sound of Ibiza.

Between 2001 and 2004, he also released a number of tracks under the music persona, Kansai. The two most notable tracks released under this name were "Rococco" and "Remember This Night", both of which featured on various albums, including a number of Platipus Records compilation albums.

In 2002, "Rococco" featured on the video game Midnight Club II.

Today, Rapacioli is the owner of Zenhiser, a sound design record label.

Discography

Notable singles

Notable remixes

References

External links
 Tony Rapacioli Discography Discogs
 Official Zenhiser website

English record producers
English house musicians
English trance musicians
English DJs
Breakbeat hardcore musicians
DJs from London
Living people
Year of birth missing (living people)